Tsvetniki is a rural locality (a settlement) in Zhukovsky District, Bryansk Oblast, Russia. The population was 96 as of 2010. There are 4 streets.

Geography 
Tsvetniki is located 22 km south of Zhukovka (the district's administrative centre) by road. Pesochnya is the nearest rural locality.

References 

Rural localities in Zhukovsky District, Bryansk Oblast